The 2012 Nebelhorn Trophy was held on September 27–29, 2012 at the Eislaufzentrum Oberstdorf. The event is held annually in Oberstdorf, Germany and is named after the Nebelhorn, a nearby mountain.

It is one of the first international senior competitions of the season. Skaters are entered by their respective national federations and compete in four disciplines: men's singles, ladies' singles, pair skating, and ice dance. The Fritz-Geiger-Memorial Trophy is presented to the team with the highest placements across all disciplines.

Entries

Results

Men
Japan's Nobunari Oda returned from injury to win gold at Nebelhorn, while Russia's Konstantin Menshov took silver, and the United States' Keegan Messing took bronze.

Ladies
Canada's Kaetlyn Osmond won her first senior international title, Russia's Adelina Sotnikova took the silver, and Japan's Haruka Imai won bronze.

Pairs
Russia's Tatiana Volosozhar / Maxim Trankov repeated as Nebelhorn champions, while the United States' Caydee Denney / John Coughlin took silver and France's Vanessa James / Morgan Cipres won bronze, their first international medal. There were two withdrawals following the short program – Russia's Vera Bazarova / Yuri Larionov withdrew due to a recurrence of an jury to Bazarova's right hip, while Germany's Mari Vartmann picked into her right foot when she fell on a throw triple loop during the short and was unable to put on her skate the next day due to swelling.

Ice dance
Madison Chock / Evan Bates of the United States won their first international title, while Julia Zlobina / Alexander Sitnikov of Azerbaijan took the silver, and Germany's Nelli Zhiganshina / Alexander Gazsi dropped from first after the short dance to finish third overall.

References

External links

 Entries at the International Skating Union
 2012 Nebelhorn Trophy results
 2012 Nebelhorn Trophy at Deutsche Eislauf-Union

Nebelhorn Trophy
Nebelhorn
Nebelhorn Trophy